In set theory, the axiom schema of replacement is a schema of axioms in Zermelo–Fraenkel set theory (ZF) that asserts that the image of any set under any definable mapping is also a set. It is necessary for the construction of certain infinite sets in ZF.

The axiom schema is motivated by the idea that whether a class is a set depends only on the cardinality of the class, not on the rank of its elements. Thus, if one class is "small enough" to be a set, and there is a surjection from that class to a second class, the axiom states that the second class is also a set. However, because ZFC only speaks of sets, not proper classes, the schema is stated only for definable surjections, which are identified with their defining formulas.

Statement 

Suppose  is a definable binary relation (which may be a proper class) such that for every set  there is a unique set  such that  holds. There is a corresponding definable function , where  if and only if .

This can be seen as a principle of smallness: the axiom states that if  is small enough to be a set, then  is also small enough to be a set. It is implied by the stronger axiom of limitation of size.

In the formal language of set theory, the axiom schema is:

For clarity, in the case of no variables , this simplifies to:

Applications 
The axiom schema of replacement is not necessary for the proofs of most theorems of ordinary mathematics. Indeed, Zermelo set theory (Z) already can interpret second-order arithmetic and much of type theory in finite types, which in turn are sufficient to formalize the bulk of mathematics. Although the axiom schema of replacement is a standard axiom in set theory today, it is often omitted from systems of type theory and foundation systems in topos theory.

At any rate, the axiom schema drastically increases the strength of ZF, both in terms of the theorems it can prove - for example the sets shown to exist - and also in terms of its proof-theoretic consistency strength, compared to Z. Some important examples follow:

 Using the modern definition due to von Neumann, proving the existence of any limit ordinal greater than ω requires the replacement axiom. The ordinal number ω·2 = ω + ω is the first such ordinal. The axiom of infinity asserts the existence of an infinite set ω = {0, 1, 2, ...}. One may hope to define ω·2 as the union of the sequence {ω, ω + 1, ω + 2,...}. However, arbitrary such classes of ordinals need not be sets - for example, the class of all ordinals is not a set. Replacement now allows one to replace each finite number n in ω with the corresponding ω + n, and thus guarantees that this class is a set. As a clarification, note that one can easily construct a well-ordered set that is isomorphic to ω·2 without resorting to replacement – simply take the disjoint union of two copies of ω, with the second copy greater than the first – but that this is not an ordinal since it is not totally ordered by inclusion.
 Larger ordinals rely on replacement less directly. A set of relations is thus a subset of )). Replace each well-ordered set with its ordinal. This is the set of countable ordinals ω1, which can itself be shown to be uncountable. The construction uses replacement twice; once to ensure an ordinal assignment for each well ordered set and again to replace well ordered sets by their ordinals. This is a special case of the result of Hartogs number, and the general case can be proved similarly.
 In light of the above, the existence of an assignment of an ordinal to every well-ordered set requires replacement as well. Similarly the von Neumann cardinal assignment which assigns a cardinal number to each set requires replacement, as well as axiom of choice.
 Similarly, Harvey Friedman showed that replacement is required to show that Borel sets are determined. The proven result is Donald A. Martin's Borel determinacy theorem.
 ZF with replacement proves the consistency of Z, as the set Vω·2 is a model of Z whose existence can be proved in ZF. The cardinal number  is the first one which can be shown to exist in ZF but not in Z. For clarification, note that Gödel's second incompleteness theorem shows that each of these theories contains a sentence, "expressing" the theory's own consistency, that is unprovable in that theory, if that theory is consistent - this result is often loosely expressed as the claim that neither of these theories can prove its own consistency, if it is consistent.

Relation to other axiom schemas

Collection 

The axiom schema of collection is closely related to and frequently confused with the axiom schema of replacement. 
Over the remainder of the ZF axioms, it is equivalent to the axiom schema of replacement. The axiom of collection is stronger than replacement in the absence of the power set axiom or its constructive counterpart of ZF but weaker in the framework of IZF, which lacks the law of excluded middle.

While replacement can be read to say that the image of a function is a set, collection speaks about images of relations and then merely says that some superclass of the relation's image is a set. 
In this case, the image set  whose existence is asserted must contain at least one such  for each  in the original set, with no guarantee that it will contain only one.

Then the axiom schema is:

The axiom schema is sometimes stated without prior restrictions (apart from  not occurring free in ) on the predicate, :

The resulting axiom schema is also called the axiom schema of boundedness.

Separation 
The axiom schema of separation, the other axiom schema in ZFC, is implied by the axiom schema of replacement and the axiom of empty set. Recall that the axiom schema of separation includes

The proof is as follows. Begin with a formula  that does not mention , and a set . If no element  of  satisfies  then the set  desired by the relevant instance of the axiom schema of separation is the empty set. Otherwise, choose a fixed  in  such that  holds. Define a class function  such that, for any element ,  if  holds and  if  is false. Then the image of  under , i.e., the set , exists (by the axiom of replacement) and is precisely the set  required for the axiom of separation.

This result shows that it is possible to axiomatize ZFC with a single infinite axiom schema. Because at least one such infinite schema is required (ZFC is not finitely axiomatizable), this shows that the axiom schema of replacement can stand as the only infinite axiom schema in ZFC if desired. Because the axiom schema of separation is not independent, it is sometimes omitted from contemporary statements of the Zermelo-Fraenkel axioms.

Separation is still important, however, for use in fragments of ZFC, because of historical considerations, and for comparison with alternative axiomatizations of set theory. A formulation of set theory that does not include the axiom of replacement will likely include some form of the axiom of separation, to ensure that its models contain a sufficiently rich collection of sets. In the study of models of set theory, it is sometimes useful to consider models of ZFC without replacement, such as the models  in von Neumann's hierarchy.

The proof above uses the law of excluded middle in assuming that if  is nonempty then it must contain an element (in intuitionistic logic, a set is "empty" if it does not contain an element, and "nonempty" is the formal negation of this, which is weaker than "does contain an element"). The axiom of separation is included in intuitionistic set theory.

History 
The axiom schema of replacement was not part of Ernst Zermelo's 1908 axiomatisation of set theory (Z). Some informal approximation to it existed in Cantor's unpublished works, and it appeared again informally in Mirimanoff (1917).

 
Its publication by Abraham Fraenkel in 1922 is what makes modern set theory Zermelo-Fraenkel set theory (ZFC). The axiom was independently discovered and announced by Thoralf Skolem later in the same year (and published in 1923). Zermelo himself incorporated Fraenkel's axiom in his revised system he published in 1930, which also included as a new axiom von Neumann's axiom of foundation. Although it is Skolem's first order version of the axiom list that we use today, he usually gets no credit since each individual axiom was developed earlier by either Zermelo or Fraenkel. The phrase “Zermelo-Fraenkel set theory” was first used in print by von Neumann in 1928.

Zermelo and Fraenkel had corresponded heavily in 1921; the axiom of replacement was a major topic of this exchange. Fraenkel initiated correspondence with Zermelo sometime in March 1921. His letters before the one dated 6 May 1921 are lost though. Zermelo first admitted to a gap in his system in a reply to Fraenkel dated 9 May 1921. On 10 July 1921, Fraenkel completed and submitted for publication a paper (published in 1922) that described his axiom as allowing arbitrary replacements: "If M is a set and each element of M is replaced by [a set or an urelement] then M turns into a set again" (parenthetical completion and translation by Ebbinghaus). Fraenkel's 1922 publication thanked Zermelo for helpful arguments. Prior to this publication, Fraenkel publicly announced his new axiom at a meeting of the German Mathematical Society held in Jena on 22 September 1921. Zermelo was present at this meeting; in the discussion following Fraenkel's talk he accepted the axiom of replacement in general terms, but expressed reservations regarding its extent.

Thoralf Skolem made public his discovery of the gap in Zermelo's system (the same gap that Fraenkel had found) in a talk he gave on 6 July 1922 at the 5th Congress of Scandinavian Mathematicians, which was held in Helsinki; the proceedings of this congress were published in 1923. Skolem presented a resolution in terms of first-order definable replacements: "Let U be a definite proposition that holds for certain pairs (a, b) in the domain B; assume further, that for every a there exists at most one b such that U is true. Then, as a ranges over the elements of a set Ma, b ranges over all elements of a set Mb." In the same year, Fraenkel wrote a review of Skolem's paper, in which Fraenkel simply stated that Skolem's considerations correspond to his own.

Zermelo himself never accepted Skolem's formulation of the axiom schema of replacement. At one point he called Skolem's approach “set theory of the impoverished”. Zermelo envisaged a system that would allow for large cardinals. He also objected strongly to the philosophical implications of countable models of set theory, which followed from Skolem's first-order axiomatization. According to the biography of Zermelo by Heinz-Dieter Ebbinghaus, Zermelo's disapproval of Skolem's approach marked the end of Zermelo's influence on the developments of set theory and logic.

References 

.
. 
.
.

Axioms of set theory